Võrumaa was a historical county in Estonia. The historical Võrumaa includes the areas of the present counties of Võru, Põlva, Valga and Tartu.
Regions of Estonia
Historical regions in Estonia

Ancient period 

The center of the settlement of Võrumaa is the banks of the Võhandu river. The first settlements in Võrumaa were Kääpa and Villal on the shores of Lake Tamula, the oldest of which is Kääpa, where people lived as early as the first half of the third millennium BCE. 

In the Middle and Early Iron Age, in southeastern Estonia Ugandi County was formed.

Middle ages 
In the 13th century, the Livonian Brothers of the Sword invaded the territories of Latvia and Estonia; The army defeated Ugandi in 1224.

During the Livonian War, from 1558 to 1583, the area of Võrumaa was under the rule of the Grand Duchy of Moscow , but in 1582, Estonian Jam Zapolski remained under Polish rule.

Russian empire 
During the Great Northern War (1700–1721), Võrumaa came under the rule of the Tsardom of Russia in 1704.

References 

 
Geography of Estonia
History of Estonia